Reema Major (born June 26, 1995) is a Sudanese-Canadian rapper. She is signed to a joint-record label venture with G7 Records / Universal Music Canada / Cherrytree Records / Interscope Records.

Early life 
Reema Major was born in Khartoum, Sudan, to a South Sudanese mother and an Emirati father Her mother moved to Kenya and later to Uganda before settling in 1998 in Canada through the United Nations refugee program. In Canada, she was introduced to hip hop at the age of five by her cousin who participated in cyphers outside of their apartment building.

Reema's upbringing was strongly influenced by an early passion for emceeing and writing. Fluent in English and Arabic, Reema channeled her experiences and cultural influences towards honing her musical craft as a rapper and songwriter—something she expressed as coming naturally.

Career 

In 2009, Reema Major was introduced to President and CEO of G7 Records, Kwajo Cinqo, a member of Canadian hip hop group Ghetto Concept, from Toronto's Rexdale neighborhood, who promised to have her signed to a music deal. In 2010, a joint-venture record deal was made with G7/Universal/Interscope. Reema had gained some fame after being featured on Royalty Radio 91.9FM, in an online interview and cipher.  Her lyricism helped launch her premiere at the 2010 BET Hip Hop Awards. Rapping alongside emcees Nick Javas and Laws made Reema's performance significant as the youngest Canadian female rapper to be a part of that awards ceremony.

Her rising notoriety led to many labels expressing interest in signing her. This was the first time Universal Music Group signed a direct deal with a Canadian urban music label in 2010.

This venture was furthered on October 7, 2011, when G7 Music Publishing signed a co-publishing deal with Universal Music Publishing Group for the services of Reema Major. The deal was spearheaded by Evan Lamberg President of Universal Music Publishing Group North America and who was an early supporter of Reema's career.

Reema Major's first mixtape Youngest In Charge was released in 2009; thereafter 15 Going on 25 was launched in October 2010, and I Am Legend on May 27, 2011. The rapper has also performed with Wiz Khalifa, Mac Miller, and Big Boi of Outkast. The self-acclaimed "Mother to the New Era" also collaborated with well-known names like Bangladesh, DJ Toomp, The Stereotypes, and rappers Kwajo Cinqo of Ghetto Concept and Rick Ross. She opened for Wiz Khalifa's two-time sold-out Rolling Papers World Tour show in Toronto in September 2011, in addition to releasing her single "I'm The One" from her I Am Legend mixtape on October 12, 2011, with cameos shot in Miami, Florida alongside Rick Ross. In 2013, she collaborated with Karl Wolf and was featured in his single "Go Your Own Way".

In 2013 her song "Gucci Bag" was featured in the motion picture The Bling Ring.

On April 21, 2017, Reema Major released the first single "AK47" off her upcoming project on Gladiator Records called LegenDIARY which was scheduled for release in summer 2017, but as of now remains unfinished.

Discography

Albums and mixtapes
Youngest In Charge (2009)
15 Going on 25 (2010)
I Am Legend (2011)
#IDGAF (2013)
''LegenDiary (upcoming)

Singles
2011: "I'm The One"
2017: "AK47"
Featured in
2013: "Go Your Own Way" (Karl Wolf featuring Reema Major)

See also 
 G7 Records
 Interscope Records
 Cherrytree Records
 Brick Squad Monopoly

References 

     15. Hiphopdx http://hiphopdx.com/videos/id.25982/title.dxclusive-reema-major-spits-lyrical-bullets-in-ak47-video April 21, 2017

External links 
 Official Website

1995 births
Living people
Black Canadian musicians
Canadian expatriate musicians in the United States
21st-century Canadian rappers
Canadian women rappers
People from Khartoum
Sudanese emigrants to Canada
South Sudanese emigrants to Canada
Black Canadian women
21st-century women rappers